Youssouf Bakayoko (born 19 April 1943) is a politician and diplomat from Cote d'Ivoire. He served in the Ivorian government as Minister of Foreign Affairs from 3 January 2006 to March 2010. Since 2010, he has been President of the Independent Electoral Commission (CEI), presiding over the 2010 presidential election.

External links
 
Biography African People Database

1943 births
Living people
Foreign Ministers of Ivory Coast
Graduate Institute of International and Development Studies alumni
Ivorian diplomats